The Gura Dobrogei is a right tributary of the river Casimcea in Romania. It flows into the Casimcea near the village Casian.

References

Rivers of Constanța County
Rivers of Romania
1Gura Dobrogei